Rob Brydon's Annually Retentive is a British television show, first aired on BBC Three in July 2006. Devised by Paul Duddridge, it concerns the making of a comedy panel game show called Annually Retentive, themed around historical events, and hosted by Welsh comedian Rob Brydon. The show is deliberately parodic, as Brydon plays a hyper-realised (and exaggeratedly nasty) version of himself, while the game show blatantly steals ideas from other, similar shows such as Have I Got News for You, Never Mind the Buzzcocks, Mock the Week and QI.

Format 
Its show-within-a-show format is reminiscent of The Larry Sanders Show which explored the blurring of reality and fantasy except with the focus of a talk show as opposed to a panel game. The show cuts between fictionalised scenes that see Brydon and the producers making the panel game, and scenes from the game show itself. These latter segments were filmed in full, as if Annually Retentive were a real show, in front of live audiences at BBC Television Centre who, initially, were not made aware of its intentionally derivative and uninspired nature. A good portion of the game show segments were scripted; however, the panellists were allowed to 'play out' the game as if it were real, and occasionally improvise.

The two team captains were Dave Gorman and Jane Moore. Each episode was made available to UK viewers to watch on the BBC Three website a week before it aired. A second series began airing on Monday 30 April 2007 at 10.30pm; the 'gameshow' portion was filmed on 11 and 12 January 2007. The theme tune used is "Reelin' In the Years" by Steely Dan, though on the DVD release the song is replaced with an original piece. The first series has been released on DVD. The second series was released on 23 November 2009.

Episodes guide

Series one

Series two

 Dave Wilson is a member of the BBC Studios lighting team who stands in for June Sarpong after she fails to appear.
 For episode 2.6, the usual gameshow format was changed to show Brydon appearing in a mock episode of the BBC's Who Do You Think You Are? series. This episode opens with the end credits of an episode of the gameshow.

Regular cast
 Rob Brydon – host
 Ruth Bratt
 Steve Furst
 Dave Gorman
 Russell Tovey
 Dominic Holland
 Sharon Horgan
 Katy Brand
 Alice Lowe
 Jane Moore
 Phil Nichol
 Curtis Walker
 Ken Bruce

Reception 
Previewing a rerun of the first series, Ed Potton of The Times found that the series "provides the perfect platform for host Brydon, playing a demonic version of himself, to mimic (often hilariously) and abuse (often brutally) his guests". Ahead of the second series, Mark Wright of The Stage called the show an "acquired taste", but appreciated "the nonsense that is the panel quiz that successfully apes some of the nonsense panel games we are subjected to for real." He concluded, "[it is] one of the most intriguing comedies to come out of BBC3, and one that easily deserves a third commission."

References

External links 

2006 British television series debuts
2007 British television series endings
BBC television comedy
British parody television series
Television series about television